Hochdorf-Assenheim is a municipality in the Rhein-Pfalz-Kreis, in Rhineland-Palatinate, Germany. It is a member of the Dannstadt-Schauernheim collective municipality, together with Dannstadt-Schauernheim and Rödersheim-Gronau.

It consists of the villages of Assenheim and Hochdorf, which were merged in 1969.

References

External links 
 Official Website of Dannstadt-Schauernheim, which contains Hochdorf-Assenheim.

Rhein-Pfalz-Kreis